This is a timeline documenting events of Jazz in the year 1904.

Events

 Jelly Roll Morton started touring in the Southern United States, working in minstrel shows, including Will Benbow's Chocolate Drops.

Standards

Births

 January
 21 – Juice Wilson, American violinist (died 1993).

 February
 1 – Tricky Sam Nanton, American trombonist (died 1946).
 12 – Donald Lambert, American stride pianist (died 1962).
 23 – Cie Frazier, American drummer (died 1985).
 29 – Jimmy Dorsey, American clarinetist, saxophonist, composer and big band leader (died 1957).

 March
 1 – Glenn Miller,  American trombonist, arranger, composer, and bandleader (died 1944).
 12 – Freddy Johnson, American pianist and singer (died 1961).
 25 – Pete Johnson, American pianist (died 1967).
 27 – Hal Kemp, American alto saxophonist, clarinetist, bandleader, composer, and arranger (died 1940).

 April
 4
 Arne Hülphers, Swedish pianist and bandleader (died 1978).
 Peter van Steeden, Dutchc-American composer (died 1990).
 9 – Sharkey Bonano, American trumpeter, band leader, and vocalist (died 1972).
 21 – Leo Adde, American jazz drummer (died 1942).
 29 – Russ Morgan, American big band leader and musical arranger (died 1969).

 May
 21 – Fats Waller, American jazz pianist, organist, composer, singer, and comedic entertainer (died 1943).
 26 – George Formby, English actor, singer-songwriter, and comedian (died 1961).
 31
 Otto Hardwick, American saxophonist (died 1970).
 Stan Brenders,  Belgian pianist and bandleader (died 1969).

 June
 2 – Valaida Snow, African-American trumpeter and entertainer (died 1956).
 6 – Raymond Burke, American clarinetist (died 1986).
 7 – Don Murray, American clarinetist and saxophonist (died 1929).
 11 – Pinetop Smith, American pianist (died 1929).
 24 – Phil Harris, American comedian, actor, and singer (died 1995).

 July
 30 – Dick McDonough, American guitarist and banjoist (died 1938).

 August
 4 – Bill Coleman, American trumpeter (died 1981).
 8 – Peter Packay, Belgian trumpeter, arranger, and composer (died 1965).
 10 – Geraldo, English bandleader and composer (died 1974).
 11 – Jess Stacy, American pianist (died 1995).
 13 – Charles Rogers, American film actor and musician (died 1999).
 21 – Count Basie, American pianist, organist, bandleader, and composer (died 1984).
 24 – Buster Smith, American alto saxophonist (died 1991).
 30 – Floyd Bean, American jazz pianist (died 1974).

 October
 4 – Greely Walton, American tenor saxophonist (died 1993).
 18 – Stump Evans, American saxophonist (died 1928).
 27 – Nisse Lind, Swedish accordionist and pianist (died 1941).

 November
 14 – Art Hodes, Ukrainian-American pianist (died 1993).
 19 – David Plunket Greene, English musician, Bright Young Things (suicide) (died 1941).
 21 – Coleman Hawkins, American tenor saxophonist (died 1969).
 27 – Eddie South, American jazz violinist (died 1962).

 December
 4 – Herman Autrey, American trumpeter (died 1980).

 Unknown date
 Arthur Rosebery, English pianist and singer (died 1986).

References

External links
 History Of Jazz Timeline: 1904 at All About Jazz

Jazz, 1904 In
Jazz by year